The 1975 Texas–Arlington Mavericks football team was an American football team that represented the University of Texas at Arlington in the Southland Conference during the 1975 NCAA Division I football season. In their second year under head coach Harold Elliott, the team compiled a 4–7 record.

Schedule

References

Texas–Arlington
Texas–Arlington Mavericks football seasons
Texas–Arlington Mavericks football